Shattered Memories is a 2018 American thriller film written and directed by Chris Sivertson. It is also known as Last Night.

Plot
Holly sees her former lover Ray at the 15th anniversary party for her friends Lyle and Lois. She is drugged by someone and wakes up the next morning next to Ray's dead body. She does not call 911 because she finds his blood on her hands. She must figure out what happened to prove her innocence.

Cast

 Elizabeth Bogush as Holly
 Eddie Kaye Thomas as Tim
 Brad Schmidt as Ray
 Sarah Lind as Joanna
 Philip Boyd as Glenn
 Victoria Barabas as Lois
 Mark Famiglietti as Lyle
 Walker Borba as Adrien
 Jonathan Daviss as Teddy
 Meg DeLacy as Clara
 Stephanie Bast as April

Reception
Trevor Wells gave the film a positive review of 8 out of 10 cowboy hats, calling it "a well-acted and excellently constructed mystery, making for an enjoyable viewing experience for any mystery buff."

David Duprey of thatmomentin.com wrote, "The actors commit with all kinds of syrup, and there's no getting around that the longer it lasts, the better the entanglements become."

The British review site The Movie Scene gave the film a negative review of 2 out of 5 stars, calling it an "imperfect picture" that "has an almost soap opera quality".

References

External links

2018 thriller films
2018 films
American thriller films
Films about infidelity
Films directed by Chris Sivertson
Films set in hotels
Murder mystery films
2010s English-language films
2010s American films
English-language thriller films